Maryland Route 566 (MD 566) is a state highway in the U.S. state of Maryland. Known as Stillpond Harmony Road, the highway runs  from MD 292 in Still Pond east to MD 298 near Still Pond in northern Kent County. MD 566 was constructed from Still Pond east to MD 298's intersection with MD 213 in the late 1940s. The highway was relocated in Still Pond in the late 1950s. MD 298 assumed much of MD 566's course in the early 1960s.

Route description

MD 566 begins at an intersection with MD 292 (Still Pond Road) next to the George Harper Store in the Still Pond Historic District. MD 292 heads west from the intersection toward Betterton and south toward MD 298 near Lynch. MD 566 heads east from the village as two-lane undivided Stillpond Harmony Road. The highway reaches its eastern terminus at an acute intersection with MD 298 (Lambs Meadow Road).

History
MD 566 was constructed around 1946 to provide a direct connection between Still Pond and U.S. Route 213 (now MD 213) at Harmony Corner north of Kennedyville. The highway was widened to  starting in 1953. MD 566 originally followed Medders Road and the southern end of Rosedale Cannery Road through Still Pond. Those two segments were bypassed when MD 566 was placed on its present, straighter course through Still Pond in 1959. The bypassed route became MD 857. MD 566 was cut to its present length in 1963 when MD 298 was extended east along the stretch of MD 566 east of the two routes' present intersection.

Junction list

See also

References

External links

MDRoads: MD 566

566
Maryland Route 566